Bandaru Ayyappa (born 27 October 1992) is an Indian first-class cricketer who plays for Andhra Pradesh. In July 2018, he was named in the squad for India Blue for the 2018–19 Duleep Trophy.

In December 2018, he was bought by the Delhi Capitals in the player auction for the 2019 Indian Premier League. He was released by the Delhi Capitals ahead of the 2020 IPL auction.

References

External links
 

1992 births
Living people
Indian cricketers
Andhra cricketers
Delhi Capitals cricketers
India Blue cricketers
People from East Godavari district
Cricketers from Andhra Pradesh